The 2020–21 Bowling Green Falcons men's basketball team represented Bowling Green State University in the 2020–21 NCAA Division I men's basketball season. The Falcons, led by 6th-year head coach Michael Huger, played their home games at the Stroh Center in Bowling Green, Ohio as members of the East Division of the Mid-American Conference. They finished the season 14-12, 10-8 to finish in 6th place. They lost in the quarterfinals of the MAC tournament to Akron. They received an invitation to the CBI where they lost in the quarterfinals to Stetson.

Previous season

The Falcons finished the 2019–20 season 21–10 overall, 12–6 in MAC play to finish second place in the East Division. They were scheduled to play Toledo in the MAC tournament before it was cancelled due to the COVID-19 pandemic.

Offseason

Departures

2020 recruiting class

Roster

Schedule and results

Bowling Green had to cancel their games against Western Carolina and Defiance. They have postponed games against Central Michigan, Northern Illinois, and Eastern Michigan.

|-
!colspan=9 style=| Regular season

|-
!colspan=9 style=| MAC tournament

|-
!colspan=9 style=| CBI
|-

|-

Source

References

Bowling Green Falcons men's basketball seasons
Bowling Green
Bowling Green
Bowling Green Falcons men's basketball
Bowling Green Falcons men's basketball